Ålvund is a village in Sunndal Municipality in Møre og Romsdal county, Norway. The river Ålvundelva flows down the Innerdalen valley, through the village of Ålvundeidet, and empties into the fjord at the village of Ålvund. The Norwegian National Road 70 runs through Ålvund on its way from the village of Sunndalsøra north to the village of Tingvoll and on the town of Kristiansund.

Its population in 2003 was 202, but since 2004 it has not been considered to be an urban settlement by Statistics Norway, and its data is therefore not tracked.

See also
Other neighboring villages in Sunndal municipality: Gjøra, Grøa, Hoelsand, Jordalsgrenda, Romfo, Ålvundeidet, Øksendalsøra.

References

Sunndal
Villages in Møre og Romsdal